Nagai Dam is a concrete gravity dam located in Yamagata Prefecture in Japan. The dam is used for flood control, water supply and power generation. The dam impounds about 140 ha of land when full and can store 51000 thousand cubic meters of water. The construction of the dam was started in 1979 and completed in 2010.

References

Dams in Yamagata Prefecture
2010 establishments in Japan